Barwani tehsil is a fourth-order administrative and revenue division, a subdivision of third-order administrative and revenue division of Barwani district of Madhya Pradesh.

Geography
Barwani tehsil has an area of 501.69 sq kilometers. It is bounded by Dhar district in the northwest and north, Anjad tehsil in the northeast, Rajpur tehsil in the east and southeast, Niwali tehsil in the south, Pansemal tehsil in the southwest and Pati tehsil in the west.

See also 
Barwani district

Citations

External links

Tehsils of Madhya Pradesh
Barwani district